The Citizens' Movement Pax Europa (BPE) is a German counter-jihad group that was formed in 2008 from the merger of two previous groups, the Federal Association of Citizens' Movements (BDB) formed in 2003, and Pax Europa formed in 2006.

Activities
The group describes itself as a "human rights organisation" that stands for "freedom and democracy" against "Islamisation". It has lobbied at the Organization for Security and Cooperation in Europe (OSCE), often represented by Elisabeth Sabaditsch-Wolff, and has cooperated with the International Civil Liberties Alliance and the Center for Security Policy of Frank Gaffney. René Stadtkewitz has been deputy chairman of the organisation, and its national secretary is Conny Axel Meier. The group has attempted to claim to have revived the anti-Nazi White Rose resistance movement, and when Meier spoke at the 2012 international counter-jihad conference, he compared German Muslims to members of the Nazi Party. One former member of the White Rose, Susanne Hirzel, was actively involved in the BPE.

References

Anti-Islam sentiment in Germany
Counter-jihad